The list of Boeing 737 operators and owners lists both former and current operators of the aircraft.

Main reference:



Operators by country

Afghanistan

Albania

Algeria

Angola

Argentina

Armenia

Aruba

Australia

Austria

Bahamas

Bahrain

Bangladesh

Belarus

Belgium

Benin

Bolivia

Bosnia and Herzegovina

Brazil

Brunei

Bulgaria

Cabo Verde

Cambodia

Cameroon

Canada
As of 6 February 2020, there were 249 Boeing 737 listed in the Transport Canada database.

Cayman Islands

Central African Republic

Chad

Chile

China

Colombia

Congo

Democratic Republic of the Congo

Costa Rica

Croatia

Cuba

Curaçao

Cyprus

Czech Republic

Denmark

Djibouti

Dominican Republic

Ecuador

Egypt

El Salvador

Equatorial Guinea

Eritrea

Estonia

Eswatini

Ethiopia

Fiji

Finland

France

Gabon

Gambia

Georgia

Germany

Ghana

Greece

Guadeloupe

Guam

Guatemala

Guinea

Guyana

Haiti

Honduras

Hong Kong

Hungary

Iceland

India

Indonesia

Iran

Iraq

Ireland

Israel

Italy

Ivory Coast

Jamaica

Japan

Jordan

Kazakhstan

Kenya

Kiribati

Kuwait

Kyrgyzstan

Laos

Latvia

Lebanon

Libya

Lithuania

Luxembourg

Madagascar

Malawi

Malaysia

Mali

Malta

Martinique

Mauritania

Mauritius

Mexico

Moldova

Mongolia

Montenegro

Morocco

Mozambique

Myanmar

Namibia

Nauru

Nepal

Netherlands

New Zealand

Nicaragua

Niger

Nigeria

Norfolk Island

North Macedonia

Northern Cyprus

Norway

Oman

Pakistan

Palau

Panama

Papua New Guinea

Paraguay

Peru

Philippines

Poland

Portugal

Qatar

Réunion

Romania

Russia
Due to 2022 Russian invasion of Ukraine, Boeing no longer supports any of their aircraft owned by Russian airlines. All new orders, wherever marked, were cancelled as well.

Rwanda

Samoa

Saudi Arabia

Senegal

Serbia

Singapore

Slovakia

Slovenia

Solomon Islands

Somalia

South Africa

South Korea

Spain

Sri Lanka

Sudan

Suriname

Sweden

Switzerland

Syria

Taiwan

Tajikistan

Tanzania

Thailand

Togo

Trinidad and Tobago

Tunisia

Turkey

Turkmenistan

Uganda

Ukraine

United Arab Emirates

United Kingdom

United States

Uruguay

Vanuatu

Venezuela

Vietnam

Yemen

Zambia

Zimbabwe

Military operators
Many countries operate the 737 passenger, BBJ and cargo variants in government or military applications. Users with 737s include:

See also
 Boeing 737

References

737
737 operators